Greystone Bridge is a four-arch Grade I listed bridge over the River Tamar south-east of Launceston, Cornwall. It was built in 1439 and repaired in November 2007.

Description
Greystone Bridge is south-east of Launceston, Cornwall and carries the B3362 over the River Tamar. It is faced in stone with a dressing of freestone.

History
Greystone Bridge was built under an indulgence of 40 days granted to all penitents by Bishop Lacy of Exeter on 27 December 1439. Greystone Bridge and the Horsebridge, also over the Tamar, are thought to have been built by the same person. The patron of the bridge is thought to have been an Abbot of Tavistock. Long vehicles often damaged its parapet and repair work was carried out in November 2007, which also widened its entry approach on the Cornwall end, and traffic signals were replaced. Greystone Bridge is currently protected as a Grade I listed structure and a scheduled ancient monument.

References

Scheduled monuments in Cornwall
Bridges completed in the 15th century
Bridges in Cornwall
Bridges in Devon
Grade I listed bridges
Grade I listed buildings in Cornwall
Industrial archaeological sites in Cornwall
River Tamar